Roma Aurelia railway station is a station serving the western zone of Rome and comune of Rome, Italy.  It forms part of the Pisa–Livorno–Rome railway.

The station is currently managed by Rete Ferroviaria Italiana (RFI).  Train services are operated by Trenitalia.  Each of these companies is a subsidiary of Ferrovie dello Stato (FS), Italy's state-owned rail company.

History and structures 

The construction began in the 1930s, in different forms and in a different position from the current one. In 1985 the station was restructured.

The station has a passenger building "closed to the passenger service" which houses the platforms and the toilets. It has 4 functional tracks used for the passenger service and there are ticket offices for tourist buses.

Passenger and train movements 
Ferrovie regionali del Lazio FR5 commuter line pass through the station.

Interchanges 
  028 - 086 - 087 - 246 - 246P - 247 - 982 - 985
  Suburban Buses (Cotral)
   Suburban Buses (Cotral) to Fiumicino Airport

See also 

 History of rail transport in Italy
 List of railway stations in Lazio
 Rail transport in Italy
 Railway stations in Italy

External links 
 
 
 

 
Railway stations in Rome